Masumeh Makhija, sometimes credited as Masumi Makhija) is a Canadian actress and model. She was born in Canada. She started her career as a child artist appearing in commercials and TV shows like Thoda Hai Thoda ki Zaroorat Hai and Banegi Apni Baat. She made her film debut with Chupke Se and has since acted in a number of films, including Vishal Bhardwaj's adaptation of Macbeth entitled Maqbool. She has also appeared in several international productions, including the German movie, Gate to Heaven.

She hails from a well-known film family. Her grandfather Parananand was a pioneering distributor while her uncle Gul Anand and her mother Jayshree are producers known for Chashme Buddoor, Jalwa, Khatta Meetha and Hero Hiralal. Makhija has also appeared in two movies directed by Shona Urvashi, Chupke Se and Saas Bahu Aur Sensex.

In 2018, Makhija starred in 3 Storeys, a Farhan Akhtar production starring Sharman Joshi, Pulkit Samrat, Richa Chadda and Renuka Shahane.

Filmography

Films

Television
Banegi Apni Baat (zee TV)
Kya Baat Hai (Star Plus) as Devika a.k.a. Dinky
Comedy hour (zee TV)
Thoda Hai Thode Ki Zaroorat Hai (Sony)
Suhana Safar(zee TV)
Mausam (zee TV)
Gubbare (zee TV)
Mayajaal (Yes TV)

References

External links 
 

Living people
Year of birth missing (living people)
Canadian film actresses
Canadian television actresses
Actresses in Hindi cinema
Actresses in Hindi television
Canadian people of Sindhi descent
Canadian actresses of Indian descent
Canadian emigrants to India
Canadian expatriate actresses in India
Canadian female models
Sindhi people
21st-century Canadian actresses